Manolas may refer to:

People with the surname
 Christos Manolas (born 1959), Greek general
 Kostas Manolas (born 1991), Greek football player
 Stelios Manolas (born 1961), Greek football player
 Konstantinos Manolas (born 1993), Greek football player

Settlements
 Manolas, Thirasia, village in Thirasia

Greek-language surnames